Neophrissoma umbrinum is a species of beetle in the family Cerambycidae. It was described by White in 1858, originally under the genus Phrissoma. It is known from South Africa.

References

Phrissomini
Beetles described in 1858